Corinto Futbol Clube are a Salvadoran professional football club based in Corinto, Morazon, El Salvador.
The club currently plays in the Second Division of El Salvador.

History

In January 2021, Corinto won the Tercera Division Apertura 2020 Final against Cangrejera FC to gain promotion to the segunda division.

Honours

League
Tercera Division and predecessors  
 Champions: (1) : Apertura 2020
La Asociación Departamental de Fútbol Aficionado' and predecessors (4th tier)' 
Champions (1): 2019

Sponsors
 TBD

List of Coaches
  Alfonso Guzmán (September 2020)
  Jose Rolando Perez (TBD 2021-Present'')

References

External links
 []

Football clubs in El Salvador